Brandon Hancock (born June 13, 1983) is a sports journalist and former American football player at the position of fullback, who played for the University of Southern California Trojans football team. He was forced to retire as a result of knee injuries.

College career
He majored in communications at the University of Southern California where he graduated with a 3.91 GPA and was a member of Phi Beta Kappa; he was also a member of the debate team.  He is currently obtaining his master's degree in Communication Management and Entertainment from the USC Annenberg School for Communication.  He works part-time at ESPN Radio 710 AM for USC Trojans games, is a post-game anchor/analyst for KABC-TV in Los Angeles, and has appeared on Fox Sports.

High school years
Hancock attended Clovis West High School (Fresno, California) and was a student and a letterman in football. In football, he won All-League and All-CIF honors. Hancock graduated from Clovis West High School in 2002 as Valedictorian. He narrowed his college choices between USC and Stanford, ultimately choosing the Trojans because of the school's proximity to the entertainment industry, as well as Trojan head coach Pete Carroll.

Personal
Hancock began bodybuilding at age 13, and earned the nickname "the Hulk".  He grew in size and went from playing quarterback to linebacker to fullback.  His physique allowed him to be an occasional fitness model. He has appeared in Flex, Muscle & Fitness, Men's Health, and Muscle Magazine International.

In his entire academic career, Hancock never earned a grade lower than a "B−", which he earned once as an undergraduate.  His father is an attorney, and he has one sister, Brooke.

References

External links
USC bio
Wells Fargo Advisors Team Bio Page

1983 births
USC Trojans football players
Living people
American football fullbacks
USC Annenberg School for Communication and Journalism alumni